Mythimna sequax, the wheat armyworm, is a species of cutworm or dart moth in the family Noctuidae.

The MONA or Hodges number for Mythimna sequax is 10438.1.

References

Further reading

 
 
 

Noctuinae
Articles created by Qbugbot
Moths described in 1951